The University Fermín Toro (UFT) is a private university. It is in Cabudare, Lara, Venezuela. It was founded on 9 May 1989 according to the decree Number 168 of the National Executive. The Founder was Dr. Raúl Quero Silva, President of the Upper Council of the institution and of the Educational Complex "Antonio José of Sucre". The institution started in Cabudare, but also has campuses in Barquisimeto. The university has a library, bookshop, a clinic and computer laboratory. Students have email and access to the  Internet.

History 
On 5 May 2014, during the 2014 Venezuelan protests, armed colectivos attacked and burned a large portion of Fermín Toro University after intimidating student protesters and shooting one. The colectivos damaged 40% of the university and looted items after breaking into the facility.

Faculties

Engineering 
 Engineering in Computation
 Engineering in Mechanical Maintenance
 Electrical engineering
 Engineering of Telecommunications

Economic and Social sciences 

 Administration
 Social communication
 Industrial relations

Juridical and Political sciences 
 Political sciences
 Law

Headquarters 
 Barinas (State Barinas)
 Cabudare (State Lara)
 Barquisimeto (State Lara)
 Acarigua (State Portuguesa)
 Guanare (State Portuguesa)
 El Vigía (State Mérida)

See also
 Official page of the UFT
 Universia Venezuela

References

1989 establishments in Venezuela
Universities in Venezuela